Kundayam is a village situated near Pathanapuram in Kollam District, Kerala state, India. Kundayam is a part of Pathanapuram Block Panchayat and Kollam district Panchayat.

Politics

Kundayam is a part of Pathanapuram assembly constituency in Mavelikkara (Lok Sabha constituency). Shri. K. B. Ganesh Kumar is the current MLA of Pathanpuram. Shri. Kodikkunnil Suresh is the current member of parliament of Mavelikkara.

References

Geography of Kollam district
Villages in Kollam district